Port Belgrano Naval Base ( - BNPB) is the largest naval base of the Argentine Navy, situated next to Punta Alta,  near Bahía Blanca, about  south of Buenos Aires. It is named after the brigantine General Belgrano (named after Manuel Belgrano) which sounded the area in late 1824.

Home of the Argentine Seas Fleet ( Flota de Mar), it concentrates the major ships and arsenals; and is close to the main bases of other Argentine Navy organisations: Marine's camp Baterías and Naval aviation's air base Comandante Espora ( - BACE) .

History
Designed by Italian engineer Luis Luiggi, Puerto Belgrano opened on November 30, 1896, under the name Puerto Militar. In 1911, the French-owned railway company Ferrocarril Rosario y Puerto Belgrano opened a broad gauge line between Puerto Belgrano and Rosario. The harbor was renamed Puerto Belgrano in 1923.

The base grew in importance with the size of the fleet.

The shipyard continues doing maintenance and refits of vessels and submarines.

In April 2006, the Royal Navy's Antarctic patrol vessel  entered Puerto Belgrano for repairs after damaging its rudder while in Antarctica in February. It was the first time since the end of the 1982 Falklands War that a British Royal Navy ship had entered the Argentine naval base.

Facilities 

The base contains a naval hospital, specialized workshops, six middle and tertiary level military schools, a banking headquarters and seven residential neighborhoods for naval personnel.

Based ships

Destroyers 

 ARA Almirante Brown (D-10)
 ARA La Argentina (D-11)
 ARA Heroína (D-12)
 ARA Sarandí (D-13)

Corvettes 

 ARA Espora (P-41)
 ARA Rosales (P-42)
 ARA Spiro (P-43)
 ARA Parker (P-44)
 ARA Robinson (P-45)
 ARA Gómez Roca (P-46)

Auxiliaries and Amphibious 
 ARA Patagonia (B-1)
 ARA Hércules (B-52)
 ARA Canal Beagle (B-3)
 ARA Bahía San Blas (B-4)
 ARA Cabo de Hornos (B-5)
 ARA Puerto Argentino (A-21)
 ARA Estrecho de San Carlos (A-22)
 ARA Islas Malvinas (A-24)
 ARA Teniente Olivieri (A-2)
 ARA Punta Alta (Q-63)

Antarctic Naval Command 
 ARA Almirante Irízar

Tugships 
 ARA Querandí (R-2)
 ARA Tehuelche (R-3)
 ARA Mataco (R-4)
 ARA Mocoví (R-5) 
 ARA Zeus (R-9)

Space launch pad

A launch pad was considered for the planned Argentine space launch vehicle "Tronador II". Land for the construction of the facilities were ceded to CONAE (Argentine Space Agency). The location was selected because of existing Navy facilities, security measures already in place, large enough available area, and a favorable location for launches into polar orbits.

See also 

 List of shipyards of Argentina
 Mar del Plata Naval Base
 Ushuaia Naval Base
 Falklands Naval Station

References

Citations

Sources 

  Puerto Belgrano history at Histarmar
 HMS Endurance completes repairs in Puerto Belgrano

External links 

 Official Site

Shipyards of Argentina
Argentine Navy bases
Buildings and structures in Buenos Aires Province
Belgrano
Rocket launch sites in Argentina
1896 establishments in Argentina